Meconopsis aculeata is a blue-flowered thorny species of the genus Meconopsis with a small geographical distribution restricted to specific areas of Pakistan and India, in the west Himalayas. The species was described from specimens collected here, by Royle in 1833.

The species is highly valued as a medicinal plant, and the resulting demand for the plant as medicine has placed pressure on wild populations due to over-collection.

References

External links
 The Meconopsis Group
 Meconopsis aculeata in Flora of Pakistan @ efloras.org

aculeata
Endangered plants